Toren is a 2015 action-adventure puzzle video game for Microsoft Windows and PlayStation 4, developed by Brazilian studio Swordtales and published by Versus Evil. Inspired by games such as Ico, Shadow of the Colossus and The Legend of Zelda, Toren was the first game funded by Brazilian government's public tax credit, through Rouanet Law.

Plot 
In Toren, the player controls the Moonchild, a girl born in a magic tower, and who has the goal to reach the top of it. The game begins with her as a baby; she grows up and develops as she goes up the tower's levels, solving puzzles and avoiding traps until defeating the dragon that lives at the top of the tower. Moonchild has visions about a wizard, her own origin and tower's nature.

Development 
Toren (Dutch for "tower") started development in 2011. Swordtales' staff pledged funding by the Rouanet Law in 2013, achieving R$75 thousand. The law began to award electronic game cultural projects in 2011. Total budget of the game was R$350,000, the rest of the money being funded by sponsors.

Reception 
Toren was met with a mixed reception by the video game press. The ambiance "full of symbolism and mysticism" were praised but the game's problematic controls, camera angles and bugs were criticized.

References

External links 
 Official website

2015 video games
Action-adventure games
Indie video games
PlayStation 4 games
Video games about children
Video games developed in Brazil
Video games featuring female protagonists
Windows games
Versus Evil games
Single-player video games